Dozier Charles Hood (November 22, 1912 – February 9, 1978) was an American Negro league baseball player in the 1940s.

A native of Morrilton, Arkansas, Hood played for the Kansas City Monarchs in 1945. He died in Kansas City, Missouri in 1978 at age 65.

References

External links
 and Seamheads 
 Dozier Hood at Arkansas Baseball Encyclopedia

1912 births
1978 deaths
Kansas City Monarchs players
Baseball players from Arkansas
People from Morrilton, Arkansas
20th-century African-American sportspeople